CitySprint is a courier and logistics company based in the UK. The company operates the brands On the dot, CitySprint Health, CitySprint Office, Transworld and CityBags.

History
CitySprint was launched as a brand in 1999 as part of DMS Corporation. It was incorporated in the UK in 2000 ahead of an MBO in 2001 led by Andrew Bernard to form a same day courier company.

In 2003, they launched their own operating platform, CityTrak, to manage job booking, scheduling and courier tracking. In 2009, CitySprint introduced a real-time GPS tracking system to allow customers to track their deliveries whilst the courier is en route, an industry first at the time. In the same year, CitySprint used the MetaPack delivery management software to enable ASOS.com to offer a same day delivery service to those living within the M25 and surrounding areas as well a 50-mile radius of their warehouse in Hemel Hempstead.

In 2015, The Daily Telegraph said that with 2,000 self-employed couriers, CitySprint is the "market leader of same-day delivery services" in the UK.

In 2017, CitySprint unsuccessfully fought a tribunal case relating to a single courier, which found that the individual in question was a worker, rather than self-employed. After losing the case, it chose to apply the ruling to that courier only and require couriers to sign new contracts instead of pay couriers minimum wage and vacation pay, causing the Independent Workers' Union of Great Britain general secretary to call the act a "mockery of our system of employment rights and protections".

In 2017, CitySprint sponsored British racing driver Ashley Sutton during his second year in the British Touring Car Championship. In 2018, it became the first courier company to use a hydrogen van for deliveries.

Death of Jerome Rogers 
Jerome Rogers died by suicide aged twenty having accrued debts of over £1,000 stemming from two unpaid £65 traffic fines, issued by The London Borough of Camden. The fine was for driving over a bus lane. The debt was executed by Andrew Maughan (The London Borough of Camden), & Mike Marrs of Marston Holdings.  The fines stemmed from the bike he was required to use in order to work as a freelance courier for City Sprint.  Whilst not technically employed by City Sprint "The [courier] agrees that he is a self-employed contractor and is neither an employee nor a worker" as a freelance courier he was required to pay CitySprint fees in order to hire uniform and communication devices from them. He was also responsible for all of his expenses, including the cost of his bike, his petrol, and any traffic fines he might get while out on a courier job.

Rogers' story was told through a 2018 BBC Three drama Killed by My Debt.

Operations
They operate as a logistics services provider that offers freight, AOG and multi-drop. The company has brands to manage specific delivery requirements including CitySprint Health (healthcare), CitySprint Office (print, post and fulfilment), Transworld (UK overnight and international) and CityBags (luggage repatriation).

As of 2019, the company has a wholly owned network of 35 service centres and over 5,000  self-employed couriers.

Acquisitions
The company has made significant acquisitions from 2010 to expand the company in the UK. In 2017, the company acquired the Express Couriers, Grasshopper Couriers and Transworld Couriers. CitySprint has acquired the Peps Couriers, ASAP International, Courier Co-operative and Excel Couriers in 2016.

References

Logistics companies of the United Kingdom